Caspian Drilling Company is an international drilling company based in Baku, Azerbaijan. It was founded by State Oil Company of Azerbaijan Republic (SOCAR) and Santa Fe Inc. of US to conduct drilling services for many PSA agreements in Azerbaijan. SOCAR controlled 55% while Santa Fe held the remaining 45% of the stake.

Santa Fe sold all of its shares to Caspian Drilling Company in June 2009.

Over the 15-year period, company drilled at 30 deep water locations on 14 geological structures such as Karabakh, Ashrafi, Dan Ulduzu, Azeri, Chirag, Gunashli, Shah Daniz, Nakhchivan, Absheron, Inam, Kurdashi and Araz Daniz fields and 35 directional, inclined and horizontal wells were drilled from subsea templates.

See also

Dan Ulduzu field
Ashrafi field
Azeri-Chirag-Guneshli
SOCAR

References

Drilling rig operators
Service companies of Azerbaijan